Lawa (La'wa, L'wa) is a Mon–Khmer language of Thailand. There are two distinct varieties or dialects of Lawa, considered to be separate languages; their names in the Ethnologue are Eastern Lawa and Western Lawa. They are spoken in Lawa villages in the provinces of Mae Hong Son and Chiang Mai in Northern Thailand.

Linguistically, Lawa belongs to the Palaungic branch of the Mon-Khmer family of languages, which is part of the Austro-Asiatic super-family.

Eastern Lawa is distinct from Western Lawa despite being highly cognate because the two languages are not mutually understandable based on consistent testimonies of Eastern and Western Lawa speakers and testing by SIL.

There are two distinct dialects spoken among the Eastern Lawa. These dialects have differences in pronunciation and some lexeme differences. The differences, however, do not present any difficulty in comprehension between speakers of these dialects, due to their close interaction. The main dialect is from Bo Luang, (known locally as juang ra), which is by far the largest Eastern Lawa village, with a population of approximately 3,000 people. Bo Luang is spoken in 16 villages of Bo Luang and Bo Sali subdistricts in Hot District, Chiang Mai Province. The other dialect is from Bo Sangae, (known locally as juang tiang).

Eastern Lawa has a high level of language vitality and is spoken in the home by all ages. Government education, village notices and official business are usually undertaken in Central Thai. Most Eastern Lawa are bi-lingual with at least Northern Thai, although there are some older people who will reply in Lawa when spoken to in Northern Thai. The younger generation tend to be fluent in Central Thai because of the education system and mostly fluent in Northern Thai due to the inter-marriages between Lawa and Northern Thais.

See also
Wa language

References

Blok, Gregory Robert. 2013. A Descriptive Grammar of Eastern Lawa. Master’s thesis, Payap University.
Munn, Elizabeth. (2017). A phonological reanalysis of Eastern Lawa. Journal of the Southeast Asian Linguistics Society (JSEALS), 10(2), 23-65.
Munn, Elizabeth. 2018. A Phonological Comparison of Eastern Lawa Varieties in Hot District, Chiang Mai Province, Thailand. Master’s thesis, Payap University.

External links
Some links to Wa-related Internet sites

Palaungic languages
Wa people